The canton of Bully-les-Mines is a canton situated in the department of the Pas-de-Calais and in the Hauts-de-France region of northern France. The canton is organised around Bully-les-Mines.

Composition
At the French canton reorganisation which came into effect in March 2015, the canton was expanded from 2 to 12 communes:
Ablain-Saint-Nazaire
Aix-Noulette
Angres
Bouvigny-Boyeffles
Bully-les-Mines
Carency
Gouy-Servins
Mazingarbe 
Sains-en-Gohelle
Servins
Souchez
Villers-au-Bois

Population

See also
Cantons of Pas-de-Calais 
Communes of Pas-de-Calais 
Arrondissements of the Pas-de-Calais department

References

Bully-les-Mines